The Tour de la Provence is an early-season bicycle stage race in the Provence region of France. It is organized by southern French newspaper La Provence, which serves as the race's title sponsor for its first three years. It is held in February, as a 2.1 event on the UCI Europe Tour calendar. The race will become part of the new UCI ProSeries in 2020. La Provence has entrusted the organization of the event to Serge Pascal, who also organizes the Tour du Haut Var. The inaugural edition of 2016 was won by Thomas Voeckler.

History
Organizers intend to build on the tradition of the former Tour du Vaucluse and the Tour du Sud-Est, two races in the same region that have disappeared over time. The event is part of a series of cycling stage races being held in the south of France in February, following the Étoile de Bessèges, La Méditerranéenne and the Tour du Haut Var. The Tour La Provence takes place mid-week between the Tour du Haut-Var and the Classic Sud-Ardèche. These races are competed mainly by French teams and are considered early-season preparations for Paris–Nice, the first European World Tour event in March.

Route
The race is run over four stages in the Bouches-du-Rhône department of the Provence-Alpes-Côte d'Azur region, in the south of France. The final stage finishes on the Canebière, the historic main street in the old quarter of Marseille, in front of the city hall.

Winners

Classifications
As of the 2022 edition, the jerseys worn by the leaders of the individual classifications are:
  Black Jersey – Worn by the leader of the general classification.
  Yellow Jersey – Worn by the leader of the points classification.
  Polkadot Jersey – Worn by the leader of the climber classification. 
  Green Jersey – Worn by the best rider under 23 years of age on the overall classification.
  Orange Jersey – Worn by the People's Favourite rider award.

References

External links
 

Tour de la Provence
UCI Europe Tour races
Cycle races in France
Recurring sporting events established in 2016